Edward Acheson may refer to:

Edward Goodrich Acheson (1856–1931), American chemist
Edward Campion Acheson (1858–1934), bishop of the Episcopal Diocese of Connecticut
Edward Acheson (British Army officer) (1844–1921), English cricketer and British Army officer